Cross Rhythms Plymouth is a Christian community radio station broadcasting to Plymouth, Devon, England. The station is operated under a franchise agreement with Cross Rhythms in Stoke-on-Trent (who also own Cross Rhythms City Radio), but has separate ownership as required by Ofcom regulations.

The station first went on air on 29 March 2007.

References

External links
 

Radio stations in Devon
Community radio stations in the United Kingdom
Mass media in Plymouth, Devon
Christian radio stations in the United Kingdom
Radio stations established in 2007